The men's 1500 metres event at the 1968 Summer Olympics in Mexico City was held on 18 to the 20 of October. Fifty-four athletes from 37 nations competed. The maximum number of athletes per nation had been set at 3 since the 1930 Olympic Congress. The event was won by Kenyan Kip Keino, who beat World record holder Jim Ryun, who struggled to adapt to the altitude of Mexico City. It was the first medal for Kenya in the 1500 metres. Ryun's silver was the United States's first medal in the event since 1952. Bodo Tümmler took bronze, the first medal for West Germany as a separate nation.

Summary

While this Olympics was the emergence of Kenyan runners, Kip Keino was not an unknown quantity, he had won the 1966 Commonwealth Games and 1965 African Championships. In the final, it was Ben Jipcho who took the first lap out fast, with Keino lagging to the back of the field.  Keino moved up toward the front, but didn't take the lead until two laps to go.  When he moved forward, he did so decisively, creating a 30-meter gap on the field.  Ryun was known for his last lap kicks.  He held back waiting for the bell.  At the bell he took off in chase, but Bodo Tümmler was also intent on racing. Ryun was able to beat Tümmler down the backstretch but his last lap kick was no match for the still more than 20 meter lead Keino held onto the final straightaway.

Background

This was the 16th appearance of the event, which is one of 12 athletics events to have been held at every Summer Olympics. Two finalists from 1964 returned: silver medalist Josef Odložil of Czechoslovakia and eighth-place finisher Michel Bernard of France. The favourite at the start of the year was Jim Ryun of the United States, a 1964 Olympic semifinalist who had beaten the world record by 2.5 seconds in 1967. But Ryun had a case of mononucleosis during training (particularly damaging because the 1968 Games were at high altitude, requiring specific training and acclimatization), and was only a "slight favorite" by the time of the race. Kip Keino of Kenya had been beaten by Ryun by 4 seconds in a dual meet in July 1967 (the race where Ryun took the world record).

Bermuda, the Dominican Republic, El Salvador, Guatemala, Honduras, Morocco, Puerto Rico, and Senegal each made their first appearance in the event; West Germany made its first appearance as a separate nation. The United States made its 16th appearance, the only nation to have competed in the men's 1500 metres at each Games to that point.

Competition format

The competition was again three rounds (a format used previously in 1952 and 1964). The 1968 competition did not use the "fastest loser" system introduced in 1964, resulting in uneven semifinals. The competition also returned to a 12-man final, after two Games used 9 in 1960 and 1964.

There were five heats in the first round, each with 11 or 12 runners (before withdrawals). The top five runners in each heat advanced to the semifinals. The 25 semifinalists were divided into two semifinals, one of 12 runners and one of 13. The top six men in each semifinal advanced to the 12-man final.

Records

These were the standing world and Olympic records prior to the 1968 Summer Olympics.

In the final, Kip Keino set a new Olympic record at 3:34.91.

Schedule

All times are Central Standard Time (UTC-6)

Results

Round 1

Top 5 in each heat advance to semifinal.

Heat 1

Heat 2

Heat 3

Heat 4

Heat 5

Semifinals

Top six in each heat advance to final.

Semifinal 1

Semifinal 2

Final

References

Men's 1500 metres
1500 metres at the Olympics
Men's events at the 1968 Summer Olympics